The molecular formula C19H29N5O2 (molar mass: 359.46 g/mol, exact mass: 359.2321 u) may refer to:

 Gepirone
 Loxtidine (AH-23,844)

Molecular formulas